The 1911 United States Senate election in Pennsylvania was held on January 17, 1911. Incumbent George T. Oliver was re-elected by the Pennsylvania General Assembly to the United States Senate. This was the last U.S. Senate election to be decided by the Pennsylvania General Assembly before the ratification of the 17th Amendment to the U.S. Constitution, which mandated the direct election of U.S. senators.

Results
The Pennsylvania General Assembly, consisting of the House of Representatives and the Senate, convened on January 17, 1911, to elect a Senator to serve the term beginning on March 4, 1911. The results of the vote of both houses combined are as follows:

|-bgcolor="#EEEEEE"
| colspan="3" align="right" | Totals
| align="right" | 257
| align="right" | 100.00%

|}

See also 
 United States Senate elections, 1910 and 1911

References

External links
 

1911
Pennsylvania
United States Senate